Blystadlia is a village in Rælingen municipality, Norway, located near the southern border towards Lørenskog. Blystadlia was built in the 1970s, and has about 4,000 inhabitants.

Villages in Akershus
Rælingen